Alberto Magliozzi (born September 17, 1949, in Nettuno) is an Italian glamor photographer.

Magliozzi prefers to shoot in black and white instead of color, and uses analogue film instead of digital. His style has created a counter-trend, with him being credited as an originator of shooting with medium-format equipment. During his career, he has photographed many famous women. In some cases, his photography has created scandals. Articles about Magliozzi have appeared in various magazines, including Playboy and Penthouse.

Biography 

Magliozzi was born in Nettuno in 1949, the first of three brothers, to Gastone and Vittoria Liberati. When he was six, he was registered in private piano and accordion lessons. Magliozzi enrolled in classical studies at San Francesco in the Lazio town, but never completed his studies. He was inspired by a Tony Esposito concert to form a band called the Bum Group in 1967. They performed in clubs on the peninsula and at the Tartana club in Follonica in 1969. That same year, he met the guitarist Peter Van Wood who suggested doing a tour with Renato Rascel. The first stop was Elba Island. Magliozzi, who had a Leica M3 with him, decided to photograph the models, and Schuberth asked to view his shots. The two met in Rome, and Schuberth recommended that Magliozzi devote himself more to photography after seeing the pictures. Magliozzi moved to Milan to take courses in professional photography and collaborate with the photographer Francesco Escalar until 1990.

In addition to reports that have appeared in Playboy and Penthouse, Magliozzi's reports have appeared in several other fashion and glamor magazines such as Marie Claire, TU Style of Mondadori, Maxim,  and Boss Magazine.

Glamor as a social pretext 
The glamor conceived by Magliozzi has always been soft. According to him, the photos of him can be defined as "mischievous", "sexy", often "provocative", but never "hard". Faces and female bodies also for works apparently irreconcilable with his photographic themes, even temporary living "installations", in disparate "natural" locations, but almost never preconstructed and artificial.

For Magliozzi, "wine and the senses" are an essential combination, and he wanted to demonstrate the concept with a work in 2015 on the most famous wines of Sardinia.

In Magliozzi's opinion, glamor can also be used as a means of social denunciation by addressing issues such asdrugs, violence and peace as opposed to war. His photographic book, Portraits of Life, dedicated four different sections to drugs, violence, and peace with a fourth section in which the models simulate the "dream" of "better expectations".

In the field of communication, Magliozzi led as president the "top of the jury examining the works" of one of the largest photographic competitions ever held in Trieste: Communicating with images: photography. The competition as explained by Il Piccolo was a "'competition of ideas', a small laboratory of color, ideas, techniques and interpretations to highlight the entire territory of Trieste, at its best-known corners or niches to be rediscovered [...] is part of the recent proposals launched by 'Il Giulia per Trieste', a form of support for the enhancement of the city."

Scandals 

Magliozzi used his calendars as means of denunciation and protest, and to arouse the indignation and reactions, including international ones several times. In 2003, the "Madonnas" calendar was created in the deconsecrated churches of the Sassi di Matera by models and young local girls photographed half-naked to address the religious theme of the Madonna, understood as a simple "undressed woman" from the religious significance attributed by some churches. In 2009, he created the "Weapon of mass distraction" calendar, in which he photographed the then-unknown Italian Alessandra Bosco, wife of a sergeant at the US airbase in Katterbach Kaserne, Germany. 

Magliozzi was excommunicated by the Bishop of Matera for "Madonnas". ITN broadcast the "blasphemous calendar" to the main television broadcasters in the English world with the photos provided by Reuters. The second calendar, taken at the American base, provoked reactions from amused soldiers and their "jealous wives", as well as indignation from military leaders. The "scandalous case" was mentioned in Stars and Stripes.

Photobooks 
 Alberto Magliozzi, Ritratti di vita, prima edizione, Naples, Eman multimedial, 2007, ISBN 978-88-95509-00-6.[28]
 Alberto Magliozzi, Ritratti di vita, seconda edizione, Girifalco, Società Editrice Montecovello, 2011, ISBN 978-88-97425-08-3.
 Alberto Magliozzi, Ritratti di vita, terza edizione, Milan, Russano Editore, 2011, ISBN 978-88-6281-329-7.
 Alberto Magliozzi, l'Arte, il Vino, i Sensi..., Padua, Altromondo Editore, 2009, ISBN 978-88-6281-329-7. Anche nel catalogo del Polo BNCF Biblioteca Nazionale Centrale di Firenze
 Alberto Magliozzi, L'accezione erotica, Rome, Polaris Group, 1995. Anche nel catalogo del Polo BNCF Biblioteca Nazionale Centrale di Firenze

Calendars 
 1997 : Éva Henger 
 2002 : Stefania Orlando 
 2003 : Madonne (tiratura 40,000 copie)
 2003 : Manuela Arcuri 
 2004 : Manuela Arcuri 
 2004 : Miriana Trevisan
 2005 : Iridi di pace sull'oceano della vita 
 2005 : Lyudmyla Derkach 
 2006 : Terra Bruna con Maddalena Ferrara 
 2007 : Carolina Rivelli
 2007 : Sabrina Ghio
 2009 : Weapon of mass distraction

Exhibitions 
 2016, Reactive in the Mirror, collettiva, Berlino
 2014, collettiva, Melbourne
 2010, personale, Florence (Sala del Gonfalone di Palazzo Panciatichi)
 2010, personale, Florence (Libreria Feltrinelli)
 2007, personale, Milan (Libreria Hoepli)
 2006, collettiva, Amsterdam
 2005, personale, Turin (Libreria Lattes)
 2005, personale, Florence (Sala Gigli di Palazzo Panciatichi)
 2004, personale, Budapest
 2002, personale, Prague
 2001, personale, Hamburg

Gallery

References

External links 
 Reuters su Alberto Magliozzi e il calendario "Madonne", foto e video
 Rai 3 Basilicata, su Alberto Magliozzi e il progetto "Matera Dea del Cinema" nell'ambito di Matera capitale europea della cultura 2019

Living people
1949 births
Artists from Rome
20th-century Italian photographers
21st-century Italian photographers
Photographers from Rome